Warren Bruce Spraggins (August 31, 1939 – September 12, 2021) was an American professional basketball player. In college, he led the NCAA Small Colleges in scoring in 1960–61 and was a two-time first-team All-Central Intercollegiate Athletic Association player for the Virginia Union Panthers. Professionally, Spraggins' career lasted from 1961 to 1971 spanning three different leagues (American Basketball League, Continental Basketball Association, and American Basketball Association).

Spraggins died on September 12, 2021, in Charles City, Virginia, at age 82.

References

1939 births
2021 deaths
American Basketball League (1961–62) players
American men's basketball players
Basketball players from Virginia
Hamden Bics players
New Haven Elms players
New Jersey Americans players
Philadelphia Warriors draft picks
Small forwards
Sportspeople from Williamsburg, Virginia
Trenton Colonials players
Virginia Union Panthers men's basketball players